Cintia Tortorella (born 10 December 1976) is an Argentine former professional tennis player.

A right-handed player from Buenos Aires, Tortorella reached a best singles ranking of 224 while competing on the professional tour in the 1990s and won three ITF titles. As a doubles player, she made a WTA Tour main-draw appearance at the 1995 Spanish Open, and won a further six ITF tournaments.

Tortorella left the tour in 1998 and played college tennis that year in San Diego for United States International University, before transferring to Pepperdine University for the next three seasons. She was All-WCC for singles at Pepperdine in 2000 and 2001.

ITF Circuit finals

Singles: 11 (3–8)

Doubles: 14 (6–8)

References

External links
 
 

1976 births
Living people
Argentine female tennis players
Pepperdine Waves women's tennis players
United States International Gulls
Tennis players from Buenos Aires